E. C. Turner was an American football coach. In 1942, he was the eighth head coach at the North Carolina College for Negroes (now known as North Carolina Central University) in Durham, North Carolina, compiling a record of 2–4.

References

Year of birth missing
Year of death missing
North Carolina Central Eagles football coaches